Plakatstil (German for "poster style"), also known as Sachplakat, was an early style of poster art that originated in Germany in the 1900s. It was started by Lucian Bernhard of Berlin in 1906. The common characteristics of this style are bold eye-catching lettering with flat colors. Shapes and objects are simplified, and the composition focuses on a central object. Plakatstil turned away from the complexity of Art Nouveau and propagated a more modern outlook on poster art. Famous Plakatstil artists include Ludwig Hohlwein, Hans Lindenstadt, Julius Klinger, Julius Gipkens,  and Hans Rudi Erdt. A later master of the Sachplakat was Otto Baumberger.

Das Plakat was a German art magazine that was published from 1910 to 1921 by the Verein der Plakatfreunde ("association of friends of the poster"), founded in 1905 and later edited by the Berlin dentist Hans Sachs. Lucian Bernhard was a director of the association.

Gallery

References

External links

Images from Das Plakat
Das Plakat Magazine can be viewed online at the website of the  IADDB.ORG

Modern art
German art